Bernard Patrick Morris (August 21, 1890 – May 16, 1963) was a Canadian professional ice hockey player. He played for the Seattle Metropolitans of the Pacific Coast Hockey Association (PCHA) from 1915 to 1923. When the Metropolitans became the first U.S.-based team to win the Stanley Cup in 1917, Morris scored 14 of Seattle's goals (in a best-of-five series). Morris also played for the Calgary Tigers, Boston Bruins, and various minor league teams.

Playing career

Born in Brandon, Manitoba, Morris played for several senior teams in Manitoba and Saskatchewan before joining the Victoria Aristocrats of the PCHA in 1914. He moved over to Seattle the following season, played eight seasons for Seattle, and was a member of the Stanley Cup champion 1917 team. He had an outstanding 1917 series, scoring 14 goals in four games.

Morris was scheduled to play in the ill-fated 1919 series, but was arrested by the United States for alleged draft dodging and jailed. He received a sentence of two years, to be served at Alcatraz. The fact that he was a British subject did not stop the American authorities from arresting him, as by treaty, he was supposed to register for the draft (then claim exemption), but he neglected to attend his physical, thus making him the "first foreign national on the West Coast convicted of draft evasion." By fall he was transferred to an Army unit and in March 1920 granted an honourable discharge.

Morris returned to hockey after the 1919–20 season and played in the 1920 series for Seattle.

In October 1923, Morris was traded by Seattle to the Calgary Tigers. He played for the Tigers in the 1924 series against Montreal. In all, Morris played a season and a half with Calgary before being traded again. He was traded to the Montreal Maroons and then to the Boston Bruins of the National Hockey League (NHL) on January 3, 1925. He was released by Boston in February 1925, and he returned west to play for the Regina Capitals.

From 1925 to 1930, Morris finished his career with various teams in the minor California Pro League, Can-Pro, and International League. Morris managed the Hamilton Tigers during the 1928–1929 and 1929–1930 seasons. He made his home in Hamilton, Ontario and did not move to Syracuse when the team was transferred there in 1930.

Career statistics

Regular season and playoffs

Awards
PCHA First All-Star team: 1916, 1917, 1918, 1919, 1922
PCHA Second All-Star team: 1921, 1923

References

Bibliography

Notes

External links

1890 births
1963 deaths
Boston Bruins players
Calgary Tigers players
Canadian ice hockey centres
Edmonton Eskimos (ice hockey) players
Ice hockey people from Manitoba
Regina Capitals players
Seattle Metropolitans players
Sportspeople from Brandon, Manitoba
Stanley Cup champions
Victoria Aristocrats players